Hukkle (meaning "hiccup") is a 2002 experimental Hungarian film directed by György Pálfi about the daily life of people in a village. The story is based on the Angel Makers of Nagyrév.

Cast 
 Ferenc Bandi: Uncle Csuklik
 Józsefné Rácz: old woman
 József Forkas: police agent
 Ferenc Nagy: beekeeper
 Ferencné Virág: wife of the beekeeper
 Mihályné Király: grandmother
 Mihály Király: grandfather
 Eszter Ónodi: mother from the city
 Attila Kaszás: father from the city
 Szimonetta Koncz: girl from the city
 Gábor Nagy: boy from the city
 Jánosné Gyõri: mailwoman
 Edit Nagy: shepherdess
 János F. Kovács: water boy

Plot 
The story takes place in an ordinary village in Hungary. It begins with an old man who has hiccups, and takes place in front of his house near a can of milk. He observes the daily habits of the villagers, and the viewer is shown many sequences about different events: A young man drives his horse and cart filled with milk cans. Normally he would clean the cans, but he's distracted by a girl sitting in the sun. A threshing-machine is harvesting. A cat becomes poisoned and eventually dies. A mole is killed by an old lady ploughing the ground and she gives the mole to her dog. A farmer takes his pig to a sow for fertilization and the two owners watch with satisfaction when the pigs copulate. The men of the village bowl to kill time. The old man is still having hiccups.

The village seems idyllic, but there are mysterious things happening. During these events, there are sequences about women trading bottles with unknown liquids. From time to time a man dies and the collective village walks up with a chest and comforts the widow. The postwoman also shows up from time to time and gives the widow her dead mother's pension. It all seems harmless and normal life continues after the burials.
When a fisherman disappears, a local policeman is determined to find out what happened to the fisherman and eventually finds out at the end when he sees the mailman appear with a package for the widow.

With (almost) no dialogue in the movie, it seems the events around the villagers, animals, and plants have no meaning. However, at the end of the movie there is a wedding where some girls sing an old folksong which reveals the murder-mystery.

Awards

Acquired
 Cottbus Film Festival of Young East European Cinema, Audience Award: (György Pálfi)
 Cottbus Film Festival of Young East European Cinema, FIPRESCI Prize - Special Mention: (György Pálfi)
 Cottbus Film Festival of Young East European Cinema, First Work Award of the Student Jury: (György Pálfi)
 Cottbus Film Festival of Young East European Cinema, Special prize: Feature Film Competition (György Pálfi), Gergely Pohárnok
 European Film Awards, European Discovery of the Year: (György Pálfi)
 Hong Kong International Film Festival, Golden Firebird Award: (György Pálfi)
 Hungarian Film Critics Awards, Film Critics Award:Best Cinematography (Gergely Pohárnok)
 Hungarian Film Critics Awards, Film Critics Award: Best Sound (Tamás Zányi)
 Hungarian Film Critics Awards, László B. Nagy Award: (György Pálfi)
 Hungarian Film Week, "Gene Moskowitz" Critics Award: (György Pálfi)
 Hungarian Film Week, Best Debut Film: (György Pálfi)
 Molodist International Film Festival, Festival Diploma: Best Full-Length Fiction Film (György Pálfi)
 Paris Film Festival, Special Mention: (György Pálfi)
 San Sebastián International Film Festival, Best New Director - Special Mention: (György Pálfi), Csaba Bereczki, András Böhm
 Santa Fe Film Festival, Luminaria: Best Feature (György Pálfi)
 Sochi International Film Festival, Golden Rose (György Pálfi)

References

External links 

2002 films
European Film Awards winners (films)
Films directed by György Pálfi
Films without speech
Hungarian satirical films
Films based on actual events